Fresco Department is a department of Gbôklé Region in Bas-Sassandra District, Ivory Coast. In 2021, its population was 107,752 and its seat is the settlement of Fresco. The sub-prefectures of the department are Dahiri, Fresco and Gbagbam.

History
Fresco Department was created in 2008 as a second-level subdivision via a split-off from Divo Department. At its creation, it was part of Sud-Bandama Region.

In 2011, districts were introduced as new first-level subdivisions of Ivory Coast. At the same time, regions were reorganised and became second-level subdivisions and all departments were converted into third-level subdivisions. At this time, Fresco Department became part of Gbôklé Region in Bas-Sassandra District. (Fresco Department was combined with Bas-Sassandra Region to create Bas-Sassandra District.)

Notes

Departments of Gbôklé
2008 establishments in Ivory Coast
States and territories established in 2008